The United People's Democratic Party (UPDP) is a political party in Tanzania. The party was registered on 4 February 1993.

The party didn't field a presidential candidate in the 14 December 2005 election, but supported Sengondo Mvungi of the National Convention for Construction and Reform-Mageuzi. He placed fifth out of ten candidates, winning 0.49% of the vote.

In the 2015 presidential election its candidate was Fahmi Dovutwa.

References

1993 establishments in Tanzania
Political parties established in 1993
Political parties in Tanzania